A creance is a long, light cord used to tether a flying hawk or falcon during training in falconry. It is used when the bird is young, or when the bird has been taken out of the aviary for a moult or other reasons.

The creance itself is thin, designed to be of as little inconvenience to the bird as possible. It is threaded through the swivel and tied with a falconer's knot. The creance typically extends to around 25 m (82 ft), at which point the bird should be ready to fly free (without the use of the creance).

See also
Leash
Lead (tack)
Fiador (tack)

References

Falconry